The video game industry has been substantially impacted by the COVID-19 pandemic in various ways, most often due to concerns over travel to and from China or elsewhere, and delays in the manufacturing processes within China.

Overview
In contrast to many other economic sectors that are drastically affected by the pandemic, the video game industry has been more resilient. Most video game developers, publishers, and operators have been able to maintain operations with employees remote working to sustain game development and digital releases, though some productivity issues arose. With many people globally at home and unable to work, online gaming has observed record numbers of players during the pandemic as a popular activity to counter physical distancing for society, a practice recommended by the World Health Organization that helped boost revenues for many companies in the gaming industry.

There have still been negative impacts on the industry, notably with major trade events like E3 2020 cancelled or postponed which may have impacted relationships between the smaller developers and publishers. This has particularly impacted indie developers who typically use these events for face-to-face meetings with potential partners to gain funding and publishing support, and caused them to have to delay or cancel projects. Many esport leagues had to alter plans for their games, transitioning from live events to remote play or cancellation altogether. Portions of the sector that relied on physical products, such as retail stores and peripheral makers, as well as those dependent on in-person activities such as quality assurance through playtesting, ratings evaluation, and marketing, also struggled with global stay-at-home orders.

As the origin of the pandemic, China is expected to impact the supply chains for electronics, which may limit hardware availability once the pandemic begins to be resolved. However, it did not impact plans for Microsoft and Sony to release the Xbox Series X and PlayStation 5 respectively in Fall 2020.

Cancelled or affected industry events 
Many trade events and expositions for the industry were cancelled or postponed due to bans against public gatherings during the pandemic. E3 2020 was cancelled by March 2020 by the Entertainment Software Association (ESA). On 11 March 2020, the ESA affirmed that they cancelled the physical event as they were looking to arrange for virtual presentations from its exhibitors, but by April 2020, they determined that the logistics of arranging a virtual event was too difficult due to disruptions from the pandemic, and cancelled the event in 2020, with plans in place to return in 2021. The ESA offered the E3 website to help partners support product announcements in lieu of E3's cancellation. Additional events were arranged to substitute for the trade event, such as Geoff Keighley arranging a four-month Summer Game Fest with several game developers, publishers, and other industry leaders to provide announcements and game demos from May to August 2020.

Other cancelled or postponed events included:
 The 2020 Vancouver Retro Gaming Expo in New Westminster was postponed until 25 June 2022.
 The Taipei Game Show, planned from 6–9 February 2020, was postponed until 25–28 June 2020, but was cancelled in March 2020 due to pandemic's escalation.
 The Mobile World Congress, to have been held in Barcelona, Spain, in March 2020 was cancelled as several of the China-based vendors had to cancel plans.
 Several vendors withdrew or scaled plans back to present at PAX East in Boston at the end of February 2020, including Sony Interactive Entertainment, Square Enix, Electronic Arts, Capcom, CD Projekt, and PUBG Corporation.
 Several companies pulled out from the Game Developers Conference (GDC) in San Francisco in March 2020, forcing the organizers to postpone the show to later in the year. However, the event organizers devised a scheme to run the GDC as a virtual conference following a similar schedule across the same set of days by using the streaming services with a subset of the planned events that are presented through the streaming media and was made available online a week later. This included the Game Developers Choice Awards and Independent Games Festival presentations.
 The 16th British Academy Games Awards, normally presented at a ceremony in London, were moved to a live streamed event due to concerns over the pandemic.
 Gamescom, which was to be held in Cologne, Germany, was forced to cancel as Germany banned public events through August 2020 following the lifting of the initial lockdown, but organizers will move some portions of the event to be solely online. Gamescom Asia, which was to be held in Singapore, was postponed to 2021.
 TennoCon 2020 was cancelled.
 Paris Games Week, planned for 23–27 October 2020, was cancelled.
 Tokyo Game Show that was scheduled to run 24–27 September 2020, was cancelled, though online events were held in its place.
 EGX 2020, planned for 17–20 September 2020, was cancelled, though online events were held 12–20 September 2020.
Insomnia66, set to take place 10–13 April 2020 at the NEC, Birmingham was cancelled in March 2020
 COMPUTEX Taipei 2020, planned for 2–6 June 2020, was postponed to 28–30 September 2020, but was cancelled in June 2020.
 The 2020 BlizzCon was cancelled.
 Brasil Game Show 2020, which was planned for 8–12 October 2020, was cancelled.
South by Southwest in Austin, Texas, was cancelled, though the SXSW Gaming Awards were still awarded though an online announcement in March 2020.
 Emerald City Comic Con planned for Seattle, Washington, in March was cancelled.
 TwitchCon Europe and TwitchCon US were cancelled.
 Minecon was cancelled.
 The 25th QuakeCon event, planned for Dallas, Texas in August.
 The San Diego Comic Con, planned in July 2020, was cancelled.
 The 17th annual Touhou Project dōjinshi convention (Reitaisai) planned in Tokyo, Japan, first planned on 22 March 2020, was postponed until 17 May, before being cancelled on 12 April, five days following the initial announcement of a state of emergency made by the Japanese government. 
 Comiket 98, a dōjinshi convention held in Japan, was cancelled.
 2020 Gaming Community Expo scheduled for Orlando, Florida, in June was cancelled. The event moved online as a charity marathon.
 PAX West 2020, originally scheduled for 4–7 September 2020 and PAX Australia 2020, originally scheduled for 9–11 October 2020, collaborated with EGX to host PAX Online x EGX Digital, which was held 12–20 September 2020.
The 2021 Japanese Amusement Expo (JAEPO) was cancelled in an 1 October 2020's announcement.

Esports 
Most esports events are based on online games, but are typically played in local arenas to reduce network latency between players as well as to provide an audience. The pandemic caused many of these events to either become cancelled or switch to a fully online format for 2020:

 ESL Pro League Season 11, a Counter-Strike: Global Offensive tournament was originally going to be an offline event with the finals taking place at Denver, Colorado, United States. However, due to the pandemic, ESL announced that both the regular season and the finals would be split into two regions: Europe and North America. The regular season and the finals were played entirely online.
 The competitions for non-rhythm games of the ninth season of Konami Arcade Championships (KAC), which were to be held from 22 and 24 February at e-sports GINZA Studio, were postponed indefinitely. This did not affect the competitions within Konami's Bemani rhythm games, as they were held earlier that month at the Japan Amusement Expo. On 16 December, Konami announced that the tenth season in 2021 would restrict participation to Japanese players only instead of worldwide as it has been traditionally done since 2012 (which include South Korea, Asia and United States), as a result of the travel restrictions set by the Japanese government; in addition, the finals that were to be held on 6 and 7 March 2021, would be in the GINZA Studio, behind closed doors. On 7 January 2021, Konami extended the qualifying period for the 10th tournament indefinitely while the finals were postponed. On 8 February 2021, Konami announced the 9th tournament would be cancelled. On 22 March 2021, a day after the state of emergency was lifted, the qualifier rounds were announced to end on 20 April.
 闘神祭2020 (Tōshinsai), a cross-arcade game tournament held in Japan that is co-organised by NTT-esports and Taito, was cancelled. The finals initially scheduled from 16–17 May were postponed to 8–9 August.
 The Overwatch League, in its 2020 season and third overall, planned to implement a home/away approach to regular season play similar to professional sports, with teams travelling across the globe to various homestand events for matches. With the pandemic, numerous changes to the league's plans had to be implemented, which included switching to online matches, reworking the teams' distributions in divisions as some teams were forced to suspend operations, cancelling certain mid-season events, and otherwise reducing the planned schedule of play. During the 2021 season, there were limited homestands by the Chinese teams and Dallas Fuel. To reduce latency during interregional tournaments, teams from the West division (North America and Europe) travelled to the University of Hawaiʻi at Mānoa, as they could connect to a Tokyo-based game server via an undersea communications cable link. The playoffs and finals were originally scheduled to be held as live events in Los Angeles and Arlington respectively, but it was cancelled and replaced with the same remote format as earlier due to COVID-19 and Delta variant concerns.
 The League of Legends Rift Rivals and Mid-Season Invitational tournaments were cancelled, with the latter being replaced with the 2020 Mid-Season Streamathon, while 2020 World Championship would be played exclusively in Shanghai using the "isolation bubble" environment. In addition, majority of regional leagues, including League of Legends Championship Series and the League of Legends European Championship were either played in arenas without audience or switched to online formats. Due to national travel restrictions, esports teams of Vietnam Championship Series could not participate in the 2020 World Championship and 2021 Mid-Season Invitational.
 NACE was forced to suspend play until April 13, 2020 on March 16, 2020.
 The 2020 Pokémon World Championships was cancelled by The Pokémon Company including its North American (scheduled for 26–28 June) and global (scheduled for 14–16 August) events.
 The 2020 Nürburgring World Tour, a live event of the 2020 FIA-Certified Gran Turismo Championships season, was cancelled after the 2020 Nürburgring 24 Hours was postponed by the organizers to September. As the online season had begun on 17 March, the decision was made to change the stage that was planned to end on 18 April an "exhibition stage", and to restart the season on 25 April. A teaser trailer for the restarted season indicated that no further live events would be held, having held only one live event in Sydney, Australia. Consequently, the regional and world finals for the series were held as online-based events.
 The live Rocket League World Championship for its 9th season, planned for 24 April 2020 in Dallas, was indefinitely postponed.
 The 2020 Fortnite World Cup was cancelled.
 The International 2020 tournament for Dota 2, set to be held in Stockholm in August 2020, was postponed indefinitely before being pushed back a year and rebranded as The International 2021. That event was to be held with in-person spectators in Bucharest, Romania, in October 2021, but due to new COVID-19 restrictions in the city, it was announced that the event would instead be played behind closed doors at the stadium with only essential personnel present.
 Evo 2020, set to be held in Las Vegas near the end of July, was cancelled. Online events were scheduled before the entire tournament was cancelled due to sexual abuse allegations against its co-founder. Evo Online was held in 2021, with its announcement concurrent with the acquisition of Evo by Sony Interactive Entertainment and Endeavor. It was later announced that the top players at Evo Online would compete at an in-person "Evo Showcase" event at UFC Apex in Las Vegas (owned by Endeavor subsidiary Ultimate Fighting Championship) in November. However on 29 September 2021, Evo announced that Evo Showcase had been cancelled due to COVID-19-related concerns (including Delta variant).
 Mobile Legends: Bang Bang Southeast Asia Cup (MSC) 2020, set to be held in Philippines on 12–14 June 2020, was cancelled.
 Arena of Valor World Cup 2020, set to be held in Vietnam, was cancelled.
 Free Fire Champions Cup 2020, set to be held in Indonesia in April 2020; and Free Fire Worlds Series 2021, set to be held in Mexico, were cancelled. 
 The Asia-Pacific Predator League 2020 was postponed to Spring 2021. All of the qualifying teams during the event were to participate in the finale in 2021.
 The Teppen World Championship 2020 was held entirely online. Offline tournaments meant to qualify players to the finals were cancelled due to the pandemic.
While many traditional physical sports games, seasons, and playoffs were cancelled due to the pandemic, the organizing leagues turned to video game equivalents as alternative entertainment, using the professional athletes from their leagues within the games. Some examples of this included:
 NASCAR launched its eNASCAR iRacing Pro Invitational Series on 22 March 2020, featuring NASCAR drivers competing using the iRacing game. The IndyCar Series launched its own IndyCar iRacing Challenge series as well.
 Major League Baseball partnered with Sony to create a short league for 30 professional players playing MLB: The Show.
 The 2021 Pro Bowl for the National Football League, to have taken place in January 2021, was cancelled due to COVID-19, with the NFL opting to use a virtual game in Madden NFL 21 to celebrate the players selected by fans.

Television networks which normally would have shown the sporting events that were cancelled have turned to both these replacement sports programs as well as other esport tournaments as replacement programming during the pandemic. On 14 June 2020, the BBC reported that about 22 million sports viewers turned to virtual races when lockdowns were implemented. Questions over the future of esports rose with Formula 1 returning in July 2020.

Hardware production
 Nintendo Switch production in Vietnam had been scaled back due to reduced supply of components out of China because of the quarantines. As a result, supplies for the Switch were significantly reduced in Japan. In its annual report issued in May 2020, Nintendo believed that production would resume normal levels within a few months. Further, Nintendo of America closed its repair center as a preventative measure. The company's headquarters in Redmond, Washington, and the flagship store in New York City were also closed.
 Valve announced that its production on the Valve Index virtual reality headset was reduced due to the impact of the pandemic and would have fewer shipments expected than planned by the release of Half-Life: Alyx.
 Konami delayed release of the TurboGrafx-16 Mini in March due to production chain issues in China due to the pandemic.
Atari delayed the Atari VCS that was initially supposed to release in March 2020 because of the pandemic.
Microsoft did not anticipate any delay in the planned release of the Xbox Series X console, according to Phil Spencer . He stated that some games expected near launch may be delayed as a result.

Sales
Generally, sales of video games have increased as a result of stay-at-home and lockdown orders from the pandemic, as people turned to video games as a pastime. The NPD Group reported that video game sales in North America in March 2020 were up 34% from those in March 2019, and video game hardware up by 63% – which included more than twice the number of units of the Nintendo Switch console. Net spending across the first quarter of 2020 in the United States reached , up 9% in 2020 compared to 2019 according to NPD. An increase at this point, near the planned end of the eighth generation of video game consoles, was unusual and was attributed to the pandemic. By July 2020, NPD Group reported that the total sales of video game hardware and software within the United States in the first six months of 2020 reached , the highest since 2010.

Some specific examples of game software and hardware sales affected by the pandemic include:
The 2012 game Plague Inc. by Ndemic Creations had a significant increase in sales as a result of the pandemic. The game temporarily became the top-paid app on several regional app stores, beating out the perennial bestseller Minecraft. Some analysts believed that those worried about the pandemic used the game to see that it could spread as a means to placate their fears. While the game was based on scientific models of the spread of contagious diseases, Ndemic had to remind the players that the game was not meant to be taken as an accurate model for transmission and spread and referred those interested to the Centers for Disease Control and other national and international health organization websites. Ndemic later added a new gameplay mode to Plague Inc, with the goal to try to stop an ongoing pandemic through various possible options by using the work that it developed in coordination with WHO and the Global Outbreak Alert and Response Network. The company also donated  to the Coalition of Epidemic Preparedness Innovations and the WHO COVID-19 Solidarity Response Fund to help fight the pandemic and encouraged the players of the game to do the same.
The 2018 digital adaption of Pandemic by Asmodee experienced an increase in sales.
Both Doom Eternal and Animal Crossing: New Horizons, major AAA titles released in March 2020, outperformed industry expectations, with Animal Crossing selling more in its opening week in the United Kingdom than all of the previous launches in the franchise combined for the same region.
 Ring Fit Adventure, which involves physical activity, was in high demand in China as a result of the quarantine. Sales led to shortages and price gouging in East Asia and nearby regions. Similar shortages for the game expanded as quarantines and stay-at-home orders came to many Western locations during March 2020.
 Coupled with lowered hardware production, the Nintendo Switch became a high-selling commodity during the pandemic, as it provided entertainment options across all ages, especially with Animal Crossing: New Horizons. Nintendo worked to supply as many units as possible globally to most markets, which led to some resellers using bots to scalp. The Switch's high sales helped to offset low sales of other console hardware within the United States and buoy higher revenues for the sector.
 Among Us rose in popularity through Twitch after streamer Sodapoppin popularised it through the platform in late July 2020.
Minecraft Dungeons topped Animal Crossing on the North America eShop when they released their new DLC packs: Jungle Awakens and Creeping Winter. They also announced cross-platform features.

Hardware and software releases
 The Evercade handheld console, originally due to release on 22 May 2020, released sometime between 22 May and 5 June 2020.
 An estimated one-third of developers surveyed in 2020 by the GDC stated that COVID-19 caused a delay of the games they were working on, a combination of the pandemic and the remote working conditions. By 2021, this had increased to 44% by 2021 in a subsequent GDC survey. Some games that were delayed included:
The Outer Worlds for Nintendo Switch from 6 March to 5 June 2020
 Someday You'll Return from 14 April to 5 May 2020
Hellpoint from 16 April to 30 July 2020
 Yumeutsutsu Re:Master and Yumeutsutsu Re:After for PlayStation Vita from 23 April to 23 July 2020.  The PlayStation 4 versions were never delayed despite confirmation of such.
Minecraft Dungeons from April to 26 May 2020 
 Trackmania from 5 May to 1 July 2020
 Marvel's Iron Man VR from 15 May to 3 July 2020
 The Wonderful 101: Remastered physical edition from 19 May to 30 June in North America and 22 May to 3 July 2020 in Europe
 Sword Art Online: Alicization Lycoris from 21 May to 9 July in Japan and 22 May to 10 July 2020 in North America
 Is It Wrong to Try to Pick Up Girls in a Dungeon? Infinite Combat from early 2020 to 7 August 2020 in Europe and 11 August 2020 in North America
 Ninjala from 27 May to 24 June 2020
Final Fantasy XIV Patch 5.3 from 16 June to 11 August 2020, as well as the game's fourth expansion pack, Endwalker, from Q3 2021 to 7 December 2021
 Fairy Tail from 25 June to 30 July in Japan and Europe, and 31 July 2020 in North America
 E-School Life for Nintendo Switch and PS4 from 25 June to 30 July 2020 in Japan
 Fast & Furious Crossroads from May to 7 August 2020
 Kiss Trilogy for PS4 and Nintendo Switch from 25 June to 27 August 2020 in Japan
 Kingdom Hearts: Dark Road from early 2020 to 22 June 2020
 No Straight Roads from 30 June to 25 August 2020
 Ary and the Secret of Seasons from 28 July 2020 to 1 September 2020
 Death Stranding for PC from 2 June to 14 July 2020
 Wasteland 3 from 19 May to 28 August 2020
 The Last of Us Part II from 29 May to 19 June 2020
 Ghost of Tsushima from 26 June to 17 July 2020
 Monster Hunter World: Iceborne: Title Update 4 from May 2020 to 9 July 2020
Little Witch Academia: VR Broom Racing from June 2020 to late 2020 for Oculus Quest and early 2021 for PlayStation VR, Oculus Rift and SteamVR
Rock of Ages III: Make & Break from 2 June to 21 July 2020
 Star Wars Episode I: Racer Remaster for Nintendo Switch and PS4 from 12 May to 23 June 2020
 Phogs! from June 2020 to 3 December 2020
 The Dark Pictures Anthology: Little Hope from mid-2020 to 30 October 2020
 Mafia: Definitive Edition from 28 August to 25 September 2020
 Stronghold: Warlords from 29 September 2020 to 26 January 2021
 Blue Fire for PS4, Xbox One and PC from mid-2020 to Q1 2021
Kerbal Space Program 2 from early 2020/Q3 2021 and then to 2022 and finally into early 2023.
Guilty Gear Strive from late 2020 to 11 June 2021. Arcade version has been delayed indefinitely in Japan.
Warframe Major Update called Duviri Paradox from 2020 to 2021
 Halo Infinite from 2020 to 8 December 2021
 Deathloop from 2020 to 14 September 2021
 The Stanley Parable: Ultra Deluxe from 2020 to April 27, 2022
 Sky: Children of the Light for Nintendo Switch from 2020 to 29 June 2021
 No More Heroes III from 2020 to August 27, 2021
 Kena: Bridge of Spirits from 2020 to 21 September 2021
 Outriders from late 2020 to 1 April 2021
 The Medium from 10 December 2020 to 28 January 2021
 Harvest Moon: One World from 2020 to 2 March 2021 in North America and 5 March 2021 in Europe
 The Idolmaster: Starlit Season from 2020 to 2021
 Digimon Survive from 2020 to 2021 and finally into July 28, 2022 for Japan and a day later for the rest of the world.
 Seven Knights: Time Wanderer from June 2020 to 5 November 2020
 Monstrum physical edition from 22 May 2020 to 23 October 2020
 Dragon Marked for Death version 3.0 patch for Nintendo Switch from 21 April 2020 to 23 April 2020
 Everyday: Today's Menu for the Emiya Family from May 2020 to 28 April 2021
 Crossfire X from 2020 to 10 February 2022
 Cuphead: The Delicious Last Course DLC from 2020 to 30 June 2022
 Rainbow Six Extraction from 2020 to January 20 2022. Additionally, the original title of Rainbow Six Quarantine was renamed to avoid association with the pandemic.
 Gran Turismo 7 from 2021 to 4 March 2022
 Tales of Arise from 2020 to 10 September 2021
 The King of Fighters XV from 2021 to 17 February 2022
 God of War Ragnarök from 2021 to November 9 2022
 Ghostwire: Tokyo from Q3 2021 to 25 March 2022
 Just Cause: Mobile from 2021 to 2022
 Far Cry 6 from 18 February 2021 to 7 October 2021
 Life Is Strange: Remastered Collection from 10 September 2021 to 1 February 2022
 Battlefield 2042 from October 22 to November 19 2021

 Some games also received early releases in certain regions:
 At GameStop in the United States, Doom Eternal was released a day prior to its release date to separate the crowds from those purchasing Animal Crossing: New Horizons (as both games were officially released on 20 March).
 AFL Evolution 2 was released on 16 April 2020, a week prior to its original release date. To reduce physical contact, physical copies of the game were initially sold through online retailers only.
 Final Fantasy VII Remake was shipped early to Europe and Australia so the players living in the "countries that are currently facing the biggest disruption" would be able to play the game on its launch day.
 The second chapter of Deltarune, which was originally intended to be released as part of the full game (the release date of which has not yet been announced as of March 21, 2022), was released for free on September 17, 2021.
 Some games were cancelled:
 Deliver Us the Moon for Nintendo Switch, having been scheduled for a mid-2020 release.
 Doom Eternal'''s invasion mode was cancelled in favor of a single-player horde mode.
 Minecraft Earth, which released as early access in October 2019, closed on 30 June 2021.
 Nvidia's GeForce 30 series of graphics cards immediately sold out upon their release, due largely to a rise in consumer demand for computer hardware during the pandemic, as well as a lack in proper security against scalpers.

Game publishers and developers have expressed concerns that further extensions of the movement control orders from the pandemic may incur additional delays. One major factor that may cause delays is the ability to capture voice acting without access to studios during physical distancing for society, even though some of members have considered working from residence remotely to avoid troubling situations. An example of this happened with the Western release of Persona 5 Strikers whose voice acting in English was meant to start in April 2020 but was delayed due to the pandemic. The actors later received audio equipment from Atlus so that they could work at home.

Services
As much of the world's population have been quarantined due to the pandemic, video game playing and other Internet use has increased significantly. Steam had over 23 million concurrent players during March 2020, surpassing all previous records while over three billion hours of content were watched on Twitch over the first quarter of 2020, a 20% increase from the previous year's. Microsoft reported a substantial increase in users of its Xbox Game Pass service in the months of March and April 2020, bringing it to over 10 million subscribers. GeForce Now capacity was temporarily exhausted in Europe before additional server capacity was added.

The additional bandwidth from video games and other Internet services created concerns that critical bandwidth would not be available for medical and other key infrastructure elements necessary to mitigate the spread of SARS-CoV-2. To help reduce demand during peak hours, the Akamai content delivery network for many video games and major digital storefronts such as Xbox Live, PlayStation Network, and Steam capped download speeds and encouraged the users to download at off-peak hours.

During quarantine and lockdown, Ubisoft announced an update for Just Dance 2020 to keep players active: customers who owned the game could access a month of the Just Dance Unlimited service. Ubisoft also announced in its official forum that the second event entitled "Power Gala", which was part of the second season "Feel the Power" in Just Dance 2020, had been postponed. The developer explained that the company wanted to protect its team due to the pandemic, and that "although [their] team still work[ed] hard to make our servers work as smoothly as possible at home", this needed to be resolved by postponing the content. Two tracks from Just Dance Unlimited were made free to make up for the delay.

Retailers
 GameStop and its Canadian subsidiary, EB Games, came under criticism for its overall response to the pandemic. Notably, it received widespread criticism when, after numerous states and provinces issued "stay at home" or "shelter in place" orders requiring non-essential businesses to close up starting in March 2020, it considered its stores an essential business, stating that they provided a "significant need for technology solutions". The chain later revised this decision, closing most locations and leaving only select stores open to provide drive-up delivery of online or by-phone orders to the customers.
 CeX closed all its corporate stores in the United Kingdom on 23 March and asked the franchises to do the same.
 Game X Change, a regional game retailer based in Arkansas, attracted criticism for keeping the retail locations open in areas with stay at home orders.

Industry trade bodies
The Japanese game ratings body Computer Entertainment Rating Organization was forced to close operations from early April through 7 May, and upon reopening, implemented appropriate controls that reduced work hours, which is expected to delay some releases in Japan as they await a rating for retail release.

Industry support of mitigation and relief efforts
 Nintendo of America donated 9,500 N95-rated face masks for first responders in the Washington state region in March after their facility was shuttered during Washington's stay-at-home program.
 Twitch hosted a 12-hour charity stream on 28 March 2020, to raise money for the COVID-19 Solidarity Response Fund. The stream featured games, music and sports celebrities playing games like Fortnite and Uno.
 Several game publishers worked with WHO to support its #PlayApartTogether campaign, encouraging players to continue social engagement in video games via online games instead of through physical means. Eighteen companies initially joined the effort when announced in March 2020, and at least forty more had joined by early April.
 Games Done Quick, a charity-driven speedrunning event, had to move its planned June 2020 event due to the pandemic, but announced it would run a fully online "Corona Relief Done Quick" event from 17 to 19 April 2020, with money raised going to Direct Relief.
 Humble Bundle offered a "Conquer COVID-19 Bundle" of games and e-books from 31 March to 7 April 2020 with all proceeds going to Direct Relief, International Rescue Committee, Doctors Without Borders, and Partners in Health.
 The Association for UK Interactive Entertainment worked with the UK's Department for Digital, Culture, Media and Sport to push the government's campaign of "Stay Home, Save Lives" into their members' video games that supported dynamic messaging like within in-game menu screens.
 Former Nintendo of America president Reggie Fils-Aimé and video games journalist Harold Goldberg hosted Talking Games with Reggie and Harold, a seven-part podcast, to raise charitable funds for the New York Video Game Critics Circle to help mentor lower-income and under-served students in New York City impacted by the pandemic.
 Idea Factory International held an online charity auction of an official Hyperdimension Neptunia illustration by series artist Tsunako. After the auction ended, they donated the money from the auction to help UNICEF USA's effort in fighting the virus.
 Some game developers and publishers pledged to donate revenue generated by purchases to COVID-19 relief efforts:
 Rockstar Games donated five percent of revenue generated by in-game purchases in Grand Theft Auto Online and Red Dead Online in April and May 2020. Its nine worldwide studios donated to local charities, including City Harvest in London and New York, the Centre for Addiction and Mental Health Foundation, Boston Museum of Science, Akshaya Patra Foundation, Connecticut Food Bank, National Black Nurses Association, and Black Girls Code.
 iNK Stories donated 25 percent of the revenue from sales of the Steam version of Fire Escape.

 Popular games during the pandemic 
With the need to stay inside one's home to avoid infection, many gamers flocked to online games as a substitute for social interactions they would otherwise miss. Animal Crossing: New Horizons was especially particular, with people around the world turning to the game's recreation of ordinary daily life activities and social networking features as a substitute for the normalcy disrupted by the pandemic. Fall Guys and Among Us were particularly popular during this time, with the former being released during the pandemic and the latter receiving a surge of popularity. Some non-online games were also thematically compared to the pandemic, such as The Longing and Presentable Liberty. Microsoft Flight Simulator, first released in August 2020, has been considered popular during the pandemic, as many saw it as a safer alternative to traveling.

Notable deaths

 John Horton Conway, mathematician and creator of Conway's Game of Life.
 Rick May, voice actor; including the Soldier in Team Fortress 2''.

References

 
2020 in video gaming
Health and video gaming
History of video games
Video game industry